Boris Petrović-Njegoš (born 21 January 1980), known professionally as Boris Petrovitch Njegosh, is a French-born designer, a member of the House of Petrović-Njegoš, and the only son and heir apparent to Nicholas, Prince of Montenegro.

Education
Prince Boris graduated in June 2005 from the École nationale supérieure des arts décoratifs in Paris, one of the most famous French schools in decorative arts. During his studies, he was particularly involved in the creation of computerised typography.

Professional life
Boris has worked for Renault in France since 2010 as Senior Art Director and Brand Designer.

Marriage and family
On 12 May 2007, Boris married Véronique Haillot Canas da Silva (b. São Sebastião da Pedreira, Lisbon, 27 July 1976), architect. The couple has two daughters: 
 Miléna (b. Maternité des Lilas, Seine-Saint-Denis, France, 11 February 2008)
 Antonia (b. 2013)

Véronique holds the Order of Petrović Njegoš, the Order of Saint Peter of Cetinje and the Order of Prince Danilo I (Grand Cross).

Titles, styles and honours

Titles and styles
 21 January 1980 – 23 March 1986: His Highness Prince Boris of Montenegro
 24 March 1986 – 20 January 2001: His Royal Highness Prince Boris Petrovic-Njegosh, Hereditary Prince of Montenegro
 21 January 2001 – present: His Royal Highness Prince Boris Petrovic-Njegosh, Hereditary Prince of Montenegro, Grand Duke of Grahovo and Zeta

Dynastic honours
  House of Petrović-Njegoš: Vice-Grand Master of the Order of Prince Danilo I
  House of Petrović-Njegoš: Vice-Grand Master of the Order of Saint Peter of Cetinje
  House of Petrović-Njegoš: Vice-Grand Master of the Order of Petrović Njegoš
  Italian Royal Family: Grand Cross of the Order of Saints Maurice and Lazarus
  House of Mecklenburg-Strelitz: Grand Cross with the Crown in Ore of the House Order of the Wendish Crown

References

External links
 Professional Internet page of Boris Petrovitch Njegosh

1980 births
Petrović-Njegoš dynasty
Living people
People from Les Lilas
Princes of Montenegro
Renault people